Neil O'Brien (10 May 1934 – 24 June 2016) was a quiz master who was often credited for conducting the first formal well-organised quiz in Calcutta, India. He was also a chairman of CISCE. Brien served as a member of the West Bengal Legislative Assembly from 1977 to 1991 and became a nominated Anglo-Indian Lok Sabha MP in 1996. He died on 24 June 2016 at the age of 82. He is survived by his sons Barry, Andy, and Derek and wife Joyce.

References 

Politicians from Kolkata
West Bengal MLAs 1977–1982
West Bengal MLAs 1982–1987
West Bengal MLAs 1987–1991
1934 births
2016 deaths
India MPs 1996–1997